Markgrafentheater Erlangen is a theater in Erlangen, Bavaria, Germany. It was opened in 1719, and celebrated its 300-year anniversary in 2019.

References  

Theatres in Bavaria